The third season of Food Paradise, an American food reality television series narrated by Mason Pettit on the Travel Channel, premiered on November 30, 2011. First-run episodes of the series aired in the United States on the Travel Channel on Mondays at 10:00 p.m. EDT. The season contained 4 episodes and concluded airing on December 21, 2011.

Food Paradise features the best places to find various cuisines at food locations across America. Each episode focuses on a certain type of restaurant, such as "Diners", "Bars", "Drive-Thrus" or "Breakfast" places that people go to find a certain food specialty.

Episodes

Food Paradise: Manliest Restaurants

Note: This episode aired as a special in December 2011.
The list below features the nine different regional competition finalists of Men's Health's "2011 Manliest Restaurants".

Tailgate Paradise

Hot & Spicy Paradise

Big Beef Paradise

References

External links
Food Paradise @Travelchannel.com

2011 American television seasons